Tetraclea is a genus of flowering plants belonging to the family Lamiaceae.

Its native range is Southern Central USA to Northeastern Mexico.

Species:
 Tetraclea coulteri A.Gray

References

Lamiaceae
Lamiaceae genera